Paramethasone acetate is a synthetic glucocorticoid corticosteroid and a corticosteroid ester. It is the acetate ester of paramethasone.

References

Corticosteroid esters
Glucocorticoids